Thornley is a village in Weardale, County Durham, about  south of Tow Law. In 2001 it had a population of 184.

References

Villages in County Durham
Wolsingham